The discography of Violent Soho, an Australian alternative rock group, consists of five studio albums, one extended plays and twenty-five singles.

Studio albums

Extended plays

Singles

Music videos

References

Discographies of Australian artists
Rock music group discographies